John Mahia-ini was an Anglican bishop in Kenya during the last quarter of the twentieth century. he was Bishop of Mount Kenya Central from 1984 to 1993.
After his retirement, Bishop Mahiaini and his wife Started a school called St. Anna Care Centre for the orphans and the vulnerable in the Gathukeini location, his home place. It is from this place that he also started a goat project for the elderly to empower them financially. The school currently has a population of 390 children from the local community and serves 150 elderly men and women.
His driving strength is found in the Bible, James 1:27; 'Religion that is pure and undefiled before God, the Father, is this: to visit orphans and widows in their affliction, and to keep oneself unstained from the world.' (ESV)
This work is supported by people of good will both in Kenya and abroad; Britain, America, Slovakia, Sweden and Canada.

References

St. Anna Care Centre for the Orphans and the elderly https://st-annacarecentre.org/

20th-century Anglican bishops of the Anglican Church of Kenya
Anglican bishops of Mount Kenya Central